Robert Spendlove is an American politician and a Republican member of the Utah House of Representatives representing District 49 since January 9, 2014. He lives with his wife in Sandy, Utah.

Early life and education
Spendlove received an M.P.A. from the University of Utah.

Political career
Spendlove previously served as the Deputy Chief of Staff for Federal Relations for Governor Gary Herbert. He also served as the Washington, DC representative for the Utah Governor's Office, acting as a liaison between the State of Utah and a variety of multi-state and federal organizations, including the National Governors Association (NGA), Republican Governors Association (RGA), and the Western Governors Association (WGA), as well as Congress, federal agencies, and the White House. He has served previously as the Chair of the Governor's Council of Economic Advisers, Chair of the Utah Population Estimates Committee, and as the President of the Wasatch Front Economic Forum.

During the 2016 legislative session, Robert served on the House Economic and Workforce Services Committee, Social Services Appropriations Subcommittee, and the House Health and Human Services Committee.

2016 sponsored legislation

Spendlove floor sponsored SB 171 Economic Development Tax Credit Amendments and SCR 16 Concurrent Resolution on Utah's Vision for Enduring Contribution to the Common Defense.

Elections
 Spendlove was appointed on January 9, 2014 to replace Derek Brown.
 2014 Spendlove was unopposed in the June Republican Convention and won the November 4, 2014 General election against Democratic nominee Zach Robinson with 6,575 votes (56.9%).

References

External links
Official page at the Utah State Legislature
Campaign site
 at Ballotpedia
All bill references: 

Place of birth missing (living people)
Year of birth missing (living people)
Living people
Republican Party members of the Utah House of Representatives
21st-century American politicians